The Yamato 691 (abbreviated Y-691) is the 4.5 billion year old chondrite meteorite discovered by members of the Japanese Antarctic Research Expedition on the blue ice field of the Queen Fabiola Mountains (Yamato Mountains) in Antarctica, on December 21, 1969.

History
Yamato 691 was one among 9 meteorite specimens identified by the Japanese Expedition Team in 1969. It was later studied at the Max Planck Institute for Chemistry, Mainz, Germany.

In April 2011, NASA and co-researchers from the United States, South Korea and Japan have found a new mineral named "Wassonite" in Yamato 691.

Composition and classification
This meteorite is a stony enstatite chondrite. Minerals reported from the meteorite include:
 Troilite
 Spinel
 Augite
 Diopside
 Enstatite
 Pigeonite
 Albite
 Nepheline
 Iron
 Olivine
 Wassonite - discovered in April, 2011

See also
 Glossary of meteoritics

References

External links
 Mindat.org
 Petrochemical study of the Yamato-691 enstatite chondrite (EH3) II: Descriptions and mineral compositions of unusual silicate-inclusions (1988)
 Trace element composition and distribution of Yamato-691, an unequilibrated enstatite chondrites (1988)

Meteorites found in Antarctica